Tai Yo, also known as Tai Mène and Nyaw, is a Tai language of Southeast Asia. It is closely related to Tai Pao of Vietnam, where it may have originated. It was once written in a unique script, the Tai Yo script, but that is no longer in use. The language is known regionally in Laos and Thailand as Tai Mène and Tai Nyaw and, in Vietnam as Tai Do (old-fashioned English transcription) and Tai Quy Chau. Superficially, Tai Yo appears to be a Southwestern Tai language but this is only because of centuries of language contact and it is properly classified with the Northern Tai languages. The Nyaw/Nyo spoken in central Thailand and western Cambodia is not the same as Tai Yo.

Tai Mène (Tai Maen)
The Mène people of Laos claim to be from Xieng Mène (also Xieng My) in Vietnam. These two names correspond to the following two towns in Nghệ An Province, Vietnam, located near Quỳ Châu (Chamberlain 1998).

Xiềng Líp: located at the Nam Lip and Nam Chou (Houay Cha Ha) confluence, near the Cha Ha and Nam Ngoen (Ngân) confluence (which converge to form the Nam Souang or Houay Nguyên).
Bản Pốt: located further east on the Nam Ngân.

Tai Mène appears to be related to Tai Pao (paaw 4 < *baaw A), whose speakers claim to have originated from Tương Dương District, Nghệ An province, Vietnam (Chamberlain 1991). Tai Mène or related languages may have also been spoken in Thường Xuân District, Thanh Hóa, Vietnam by the Yo (Do) people (Robequain 1929).

Distribution
Tai Mène is spoken in Borikhamxay Province, in many villages of Khamkeut District and several villages in Vieng Thong District (Chamberlain 1998). The Vietic languages Liha, Phong, Toum, Ayoy, Maleng, and Thaveung are spoken nearby.

Lak Xao subdistrict: Ban Phon Hong, Ban Houay Keo
Khamkeut subdistrict: Ban Phon Sa-at, Ban Phon Meuang Noy
Na Heuang subdistrict: Lak 10, Lak 12, Na Khi
Nam Sak subdistrict: Ban Phon Ngam, Ban Sop Khi
Sop Chat subdistrict: Ban Sop Chat, Ban Sop Mong, Ban Phon Keo, Ban Sène Sy, Ban Tham Bing, Ban Phiang Pone
Ka'ane subdistrict: Ban Thène Kwang, Ban Pha Poun, Ban Phiang Phô, Ban Sane, Ban Kok Feuang
Phon Thoen subdistrict: Keng Kwang, Ban Kătô', Ban Kane Nha, Ban Keng Bit, Ban Sop Gnouang, Ban Vang Xao, Ban Tha Bak, Ban Kăpap
Sop Pone subdistrict: Ban Sot, Ban Tha Sala, Ban Boung Kham
Tha Veng subdistrict: Ban Phon Xay, Ban Kong Phat, Ban Xam Toey, Ban Na Khwan, Ban Phou Viang

Notes

Further reading
Boonsner, Thepbangon. 1982. An Introduction to the Nɔɔ dialect.
Nantaporn Ninjinda. 1989. A Lexical Study of Nyo Spoken in Sahon Nakhon, Nakhon Phanom, and Prachin Buri. Silpakorn University (in Thai).
Pacqement, Jean. 2018. The Nyo language spoken at Kut Kho Kan village (Loeng Nok Tha district, Yasothon province): A Language Documentation Research at Roi Et Rajabhat University. Sikkha Journal of Education 5(2). Nakhon Ratchasima: Vongchavalitkul University.

References

Chamberlain, James R. 1983. The Tai Dialects of Khammouan Province: Their Diversity and Origins. 16th International Conference on Sino-Tibetan Language and Linguistics, 16–18 September (Seattle, Washington, 1983)
Chamberlain, James R. 1991. "Mène: A Tai dialect originally spoken in Nghệ An (Nghệ Tinh), Vietnam -- preliminary linguistic observations and historical implications." Journal of the Siam Society 79(2):103-123.
Chamberlain, James R. 1998. "The Origin of the Sek: Implications for Tai and Vietnamese History". Journal of the Siam Society 86.1 & 86.2: 27-48.
Finot, Louis. 1917. Recherches sur la Littérature Laotienne. BEFEO 17.5.
Robequain, Charles. 1929. Le Thanh Hoá. EFEO, Paris et Bruxelles.
Thananan, Trongdee. 2014. "The Lao-speaking Nyo in Banteay Meanchey Province of Cambodia". In Research Findings in Southeast Asian Linguistics, a Festschrift in Honor of Professor Pranee Kullavanijaya. Manusya, Special Issue 20. Bangkok: Chulalongkorn University Press.

External links
 "Preliminary Proposal to encode the Yo Lai Tay Script"

Southwestern Tai languages
Languages of Thailand
Languages of Laos
Languages of Vietnam